The Round Tower is a fortification at the entrance to Portsmouth harbour. It is a Grade I listed building.

History
The site was originally occupied by a wooden tower before being replaced by a stone one.

The wooden tower
The wooden tower was built between 1418 and 1426 on the orders of King Henry V, or c1415.

In 1422, a defensive chain that could be raised in an emergency was built from the round tower across the harbour entrance.

The stone tower

In the 1490s the tower was rebuilt in stone. In the 1680s a line of ramparts was added that connected the tower to the square tower. The upper section was later rebuilt during the Napoleonic wars. Between 1847 and 1850 the roof of the tower was modified to serve as a gun platform. Portsmouth city council purchased the tower in 1958.

See also
Fortifications of Portsmouth

References

External links
Round Tower – Portsmouth City Council

Forts in Portsmouth
Tourist attractions in Portsmouth
Grade I listed buildings in Hampshire